Slater-type orbitals (STOs) are functions used as atomic orbitals in the linear combination of atomic orbitals molecular orbital method. They are named after the physicist John C. Slater, who introduced them in 1930.

They possess exponential decay at long range and Kato's cusp condition at short range (when combined as hydrogen-like atom functions, i.e. the analytical solutions of the stationary Schrödinger equation for one electron atoms). Unlike the hydrogen-like ("hydrogenic") Schrödinger orbitals, STOs have no radial nodes (neither do Gaussian-type orbitals).

Definition
STOs have the following radial part:

 
where
  is a natural number that plays the role of principal quantum number,  = 1,2,...,
  is a normalizing constant,
  is the distance of the electron from the atomic nucleus, and
  is a constant related to the effective charge of the nucleus, the nuclear charge being partly shielded by electrons. Historically, the effective nuclear charge was estimated by Slater's rules.

The normalization constant is computed from the integral

Hence

It is common to use the spherical harmonics  depending on the polar coordinates
of the position vector  as the angular part of the Slater orbital.

Derivatives
The first radial derivative of the radial part of a Slater-type orbital is

The radial Laplace operator is split in two differential operators

The first differential operator of the Laplace operator yields

The total Laplace operator yields after applying the second differential operator

the result

Angular dependent derivatives of the spherical harmonics don't depend on the radial function and have to be evaluated separately.

Integrals
The fundamental mathematical properties are those associated with the kinetic energy, nuclear attraction and Coulomb repulsion integrals for placement of the orbital at the center of a single nucleus. Dropping the normalization factor , the representation of the orbitals below is

The Fourier transform is

The overlap integral is

of which the normalization integral is a special case. The superscript star denotes complex-conjugation.

The kinetic energy integral is

a sum over three overlap integrals already computed above.

The Coulomb repulsion integral can be evaluated using the Fourier representation
(see above)

which yields

These are either individually calculated with the law of residues or recursively as proposed by Cruz et al. (1978).

STO software
Some quantum chemistry software uses sets of Slater-type functions (STF) analogous to Slater type orbitals, but with variable exponents chosen to minimize the total molecular energy (rather than by Slater's rules as above). The fact that products of two STOs on distinct atoms are more difficult to express than those of Gaussian functions (which give a displaced Gaussian) has led many to expand them in terms of Gaussians.

Analytical ab initio software for polyatomic molecules has been developed, e.g., STOP: a Slater Type Orbital Package in 1996.

SMILES uses analytical expressions when available and Gaussian expansions otherwise. It was first released in 2000.

Various grid integration schemes have been developed, sometimes after analytical work for quadrature (Scrocco), most famously in the ADF suite of DFT codes.

After the work of John Pople, Warren. J. Hehre and Robert F. Stewart, a least squares representation of the Slater atomic orbitals as a sum of Gaussian-type orbitals is used. In their 1969 paper, the fundamentals of this principle are discussed and then further improved and used in the GAUSSIAN DFT code.

See also
Basis sets used in computational chemistry

References

Quantum chemistry
Computational chemistry